The 2018 Supercopa MX was a Mexican football match-up played on 15 July 2018 between the champions of the Apertura 2017 Copa MX, Monterrey, and the champions of the Clausura 2018 Copa MX, Necaxa. Like the previous three editions, the 2018 Supercopa MX was contested in a single-leg format at a neutral venue in the United States. This match took place at the StubHub Center in Carson, California for the third consecutive year.

The 2018 Supercopa MX was part of a doubleheader, which also included the 2018 Campeón de Campeones, organized by Univision Deportes, Soccer United Marketing (SUM), Liga MX, and LA Galaxy.

Match details

See also
Apertura 2017 Copa MX
Clausura 2018 Copa MX

References

2018
2018–19 in Mexican football